André Luiz Andrade Junior (born 11 February 1976 in Campinas) is a Brazilian footballer who played in the Campeonato Mato-Grossense, USL First Division, Canadian Soccer League, and the Campeonato Rondoniense.

Playing career
Andrade had stints with clubs primarily from the Campeonato Matogrossense. Playing for clubs such as Sociedade Esportiva e Recreativa Juventude, Mixto Esporte Clube, and with Sorriso Esporte Clube. In 2006 Andre went abroad to Canada to sign with the Toronto Lynx of the USL First Division. His signing was announced on 9 May 2006 in a press conference where the Lynx introduced two more signings from Brazil. He made his debut for the Lynx against the Rochester Rhinos coming on as a substitute for David Diplacido. Unfortunately for Andrade his debut match would end up being his final appearance for Toronto. As he was deemed as surplus inn order to make room for new additional signings.

His contract was bought out by the Brampton Stallions of the Canadian Soccer League. He made his debut for the Stallions in a match against London City, where he recorded his first goal of the season in a 6–0 thrashing over City at home. He had a relatively successful tenure with Brampton, where he led that Stallions to five game undefeated streak and finished off the season as the second highest scorer for Brampton with seven goals. He helped the Brampton side clinch a playoff spot by finishing second in the National Division.

After his stint in Canada came to a conclusion, he returned to Brazil to have stints with Mixto, Poços de Caldas Futebol Clube, and Rolim de Moura Esporte Clube in the Campeonato Rondoniense.

References

1976 births
Living people
Sportspeople from Campinas
Brazilian footballers
Canadian Soccer League (1998–present) players
Association football forwards
Expatriate footballers in Italy
Toronto Lynx players
Esporte Clube Juventude players
Expatriate soccer players in Canada
Brampton Stallions (Hitmen) players
Brazilian expatriate sportspeople in Canada
Mixto Esporte Clube players
USL First Division players
Botafogo de Futebol e Regatas players
Expatriate footballers in Guatemala
Volta Redonda FC players